Castellan, in the context of the BBC television series Doctor Who, is a title adopted by one or more high-ranking Time Lords, such as Castellan Spandrell, Castellan Kelner and the unnamed Castellan, who is/are member/s of the High Council of Gallifrey and is/are in charge of the security of the Citadel. The Chancellory Guard reports to a/the Castellan. It is unclear whether the times in office of the Castellans depicted in the series overlap or not.

Unnamed Castellan

The Castellan, played by Paul Jerricho, is a fictional character from Doctor Who. He is a member of the High Council of Gallifrey and is a Time Lord. He appears in two Doctor Who stories, Arc of Infinity and The Five Doctors.

Character history

In Arc of Infinity, the Castellan investigates a serious security breach on Gallifrey. He suspects the Doctor, who is sentenced to death. After the Doctor's termination fails, the Castellan is led to think that the Doctor is in league with President Borusa. Locating Borusa, the Castellan finds the Doctor with him. The Castellan pulls a gun on the Doctor intending finally to execute him. However, the real traitor Councillor Hedin jumps in front of the Doctor taking the Castellan's shot and dying. Confused, the Castellan looks on as Omega seizes control of the Matrix. As the Doctor attempts to thwart Omega, the Castellan develops a new respect for his former suspect.

In The Five Doctors, the Castellan is seen to have voted with the rest of the inner council to overrule Borusa and summon the Master to rescue the Doctor from the Death Zone. The Castellan supplies the Master with a recall device that will emit a signal so that he can be transmatted back to the Capitol when he has something to report. Having refused to believe the Master is trying to help him, the Doctor takes the Master's recall device, dropped during a Cyberman ambush, and is transported by the Castellan, (who thinks he is retrieving the Master), to the Capitol where he learns that the Master was telling the truth. The Castellan had hoped the Doctor would know who was controlling the Death Zone but the Doctor does not although he suspects a high-ranking Time Lord of being responsible.

The Doctor realises that he and his companions, Tegan and Susan, and the Master were found too easily by the Cybermen and opens the recall device to reveal a homing beacon contained within it. As the Castellan supplied the device, Borusa orders his office and living quarters to be searched despite the Castellan's protestations of innocence. A small casket containing the Black Scrolls of Rassilon, forbidden knowledge from the Dark Times is found in the Castellan's room. He denies having ever seen the casket. Borusa orders that he be taken to Security and authorises the use of the "mind probe" to "discover the truth". Obviously taken aback at the sudden turn of events, the Castellan protests loudly as he is led away. Borusa appears to set the Black Scrolls alight in the casket, shutting the lid on them the next moment.

Out in the corridor, the Castellan screams in pain and the Doctor and Borusa exit the conference room to find the Castellan lying dead on the floor with a gun beside him. The Commander of the Chancellory Guard claims the Castellan was armed and trying to escape. Confiding in Chancellor Flavia, the Doctor states he has "known the Castellan too long... he was limited, a little narrow, always fiercely loyal to his oath of office. Any mention of the Dark Days filled him with horror." The Doctor reveals he thinks that the traitor is still at large and it later transpires that the Castellan was framed by Borusa.

Behind the scenes

Director Peter Moffatt was able to rehire Paul Jerricho to reprise his Arc of Infinity role of the Castellan in The Five Doctors, but had to recast Borusa, (his new appearance explained by one of the Castellan's lines as a "new regeneration"), and replace the character of Chancellor Thalia with Chancellor Flavia.

After Doctor Who

The Castellan's line, "No, not the mind probe!" from The Five Doctors has a place in Cult TV Awards's Hall of Shame as the Worst Line of Dialogue for 2003 / 2004. This line has also been mocked by some Doctor Who fans, as has the character.

Paul Jerricho makes appearances at Doctor Who fan events, such as signings and conventions.

Appearances
Arc of Infinity — 3–12 January 1983
The Five Doctors — 23 November 1983

See also
List of supporting characters in Doctor Who

References

Time Lords
Recurring characters in Doctor Who